Actinorhodin is a benzoisochromanequinone dimer polyketide antibiotic produced by Streptomyces coelicolor. The gene cluster responsible for actinorhodin production contains the biosynthetic enzymes and genes responsible for export of the antibiotic. The antibiotic also has the effect of being a pH indicator due to its pH-dependent color change.

References 

Phenols
Antibiotics
Acetate esters
Polyketides
3-Hydroxypropenals within hydroxyquinones